The Chinese Ambassador to Mauritania is the official representative of the People's Republic of China to Mauritania.

List of representatives

See also
 China–Mauritania relations

References 

Ambassadors of China to Mauritania
Mauritania
China